Sportzentrum Maspernplatz is an indoor sporting arena located in Paderborn, Germany.  The capacity of the arena is 3,040 people.  It is currently home to the Paderborn Baskets basketball team.

References

Indoor arenas in Germany
Paderborn
Sports venues in North Rhine-Westphalia
Buildings and structures in Paderborn (district)